The 74th British Academy Film Awards, also known as the BAFTAs, were held on 10 and 11 April 2021 at the Royal Albert Hall in London, honouring the best national and foreign films of 2020 and early 2021. Presented by the British Academy of Film and Television Arts, accolades were handed out for the best feature-length film and documentaries of any nationality that were screened at British cinemas in 2020 and early 2021.

The nominees were announced on 9 March 2021. The American drama Nomadland and British coming-of-age drama Rocks received the most nominations with seven each; the former ultimately won four, including Best Film.

Winners and nominees

The nominees were announced on 9 March 2021. The winners were announced on 10 and 11 April 2021.

BAFTA Fellowship

 Ang Lee

Outstanding British Contribution to Cinema

 Noel Clarke

Awards 
Winners are listed first, and highlighted in boldface.

Statistics

Ceremony information
Both ceremonies were delayed two months due to the COVID-19 pandemic, taking place largely virtually, still lining up with the 93rd Academy Awards set to take place on 25 April 2021, two weeks following both British Academy of Film and Television Arts' (BAFTA) ceremonies. Despite its minimal live elements, the ceremonies still featured a red carpet in London and a step and repeat in Los Angeles.

The nominees were significantly more diverse than at any previous BAFTA Awards ceremony. Sixteen of the twenty-four nominees in the acting categories were from ethnic minority backgrounds. Four nominees for Best Director were women and three of the directors of films nominated for Best Film Not in the English Language were also women. The ceremony also introduced a new voting system for nominations after criticism over lack of diversity at the 73rd British Academy Film Awards. In the first round, voters compile a longlist in all categories (with a gender quota in the directing category). It is now compulsory for all voters to watch all long-listed films before the second round. In the second round, the nominees in the directing category and all four acting categories were decided by a small jury.

BBC radio and television presenter Clara Amfo hosted the Opening Night ceremony from the Royal Albert Hall, which aired on 10 April 2021 on BBC Two and BBC Two HD, and was joined by actress and screenwriter Joanna Scanlan, and film critic Rhianna Dhillon. The first ceremony awarded casting, craft, and short film categories, and Best Actor in a Supporting Role nominee Leslie Odom Jr. performed the song "Speak Now" from the film One Night in Miami.... Edith Bowman and Dermot O'Leary hosted the second night of the ceremony, which aired on 11 April 2021 on BBC One and BBC One HD. The co-hosts, who for several years have hosted BAFTA's live red carpet show, were joined by a small group of awards presenters at the Royal Albert Hall, as well as additional presenters via the internet from Los Angeles.

At the 11 April ceremony, the Royal Albert Hall was drenched in red light. Bowman and O'Leary led presentations to the all-virtual nominees, alongside a handful of actors as in-person presenters. The first musical performance of the night was a virtual duet, with two holograms of Liam Payne singing together. Catherine Shoard of The Guardian described the live virtual audience, present to laugh and applaud on cue, as "eerie". Shaord also opined that while the nominees were atypically diverse, including twenty-one first-time acting nominees, the eventual winners were traditional. She also asserted that Nomadlands four wins indicated it as the frontrunner for the upcoming Academy Awards.

Announced on 8 April 2021, both ceremonies had been intended to feature Prince William, Duke of Cambridge, the president of BAFTA. At the opening ceremony, he planned to speak virtually with filmmakers about the hardships of film production during the COVID-19 pandemic and would have presented a video speech about the resilience of the film industry during the 11 April ceremony. However, he pulled out from public engagements due to the death of his grandfather, Prince Philip, Duke of Edinburgh, on 9 April 2021.

Chloé Zhao became only the second female winner for Best Director (following Kathryn Bigelow in 2010), and the first woman of colour to take the prize; she also shared Best Film with four other producers. Neither Best Actor in a Leading Role winner Anthony Hopkins (for The Father) nor Best Actress in a Leading Role winner Frances McDormand (for Nomadland), who also co-won Best Film, attended the ceremony and were able to be on camera when their wins were announced. At age 83, Hopkins become the oldest Best Actor winner, beating out expected posthumous nominee Chadwick Boseman (for Ma Rainey's Black Bottom); though he was not present when his win was announced, Hopkins did deliver an acceptance speech at the press interviews following the event. Hopkins' last competitive BAFTA win was twenty-seven years earlier (for The Remains of the Day). Another unexpected win was first-time screenwriter and director Emerald Fennell for Best Original Screenplay (for Promising Young Woman). Fennell accepted her award while eating a chocolate BAFTA mask. Other films with high expectations, including The Trial of the Chicago 7, News of the World and Borat Subsequent Moviefilm, won zero awards, while Mank only won one (Best Production Design).

Death was a theme among other acceptance speeches; in accepting her Rising Star Award, actress Bukky Bakray paid tribute to rapper DMX, who also died on 9 April 2021, as well as recently-deceased members of her own friends and family, while Thomas Vinterberg, who co-won for Best Film Not in the English Language with Another Round, spoke of his daughter who died during production. South Korean actress Youn Yuh-jung, who won for Best Supporting Actress (for Minari), opened her speech with an address to the British people watching, offering condolences following the death of the Duke of Edinburgh. Youn then lightened the mood by noting that she was surprised and more grateful to win due to the perception of British people as "snobbish". The acceptance speeches of Daniel Kaluuya and Remi Weekes thanked minority voices.

In Memoriam
The In Memoriam recognised people who died since the previous ceremony and who had an impact on the British film industry, as well as those related to nominated films:

 Prince Philip, Duke of Edinburgh
 Ennio Morricone
 Sir Sean Connery
 George Segal
 Michael Chapman
 Allen Daviau
 Bertrand Tavernier
 Barbara Jefford
 Irrfan Khan
 Nikita Pearl Waligwa
 Pamela Mann-Francis
 Ben Cross
 Sir Ian Holm
 Yaphet Kotto
 Trevor Green
 Frank Pierce
 Cicely Tyson
 Hilary Heath
 Paul Heller
 David Prowse
 Michael Lonsdale
 Dame Barbara Windsor
 Peter Lamont
 Bill Gavin
 Robert Mitchell
 Dame Olivia de Havilland
 Michael Apted
 John Fraser
 Chadwick Boseman
 Joel Schumacher
 Brian Dennehy
 Wilford Brimley
 Sir Alan Parker
 Sue Bruce-Smith
 
 Giuseppe Rotunno
 Michael Wolf Snyder
 Max von Sydow
 Rishi Kapoor
 Sir Ronald Harwood
 Kirk Douglas
 Alberto Grimaldi
 Larry McMurtry
 Christopher Plummer

As well as appearing first in the montage, Prince Philip, Duke of Edinburgh, royal consort and first president of BAFTA, who died the day before the opening ceremony, was paid tribute in the opening monologues on both nights of the awards. Dame Diana Rigg was omitted from the montage, which sparked complaints and controversy; in response, BAFTA explained that it considered her most prominent in television, and so she would be featured at the next British Academy Television Awards ceremony.

See also
 10th AACTA International Awards
 93rd Academy Awards
 46th César Awards
 26th Critics' Choice Awards
 73rd Directors Guild of America Awards
 34th European Film Awards
 78th Golden Globe Awards
 41st Golden Raspberry Awards
 35th Goya Awards
 36th Independent Spirit Awards
 26th Lumières Awards
 11th Magritte Awards
 8th Platino Awards
 32nd Producers Guild of America Awards
 25th Satellite Awards
 46th Saturn Awards
 27th Screen Actors Guild Awards
 73rd Writers Guild of America Awards

Notes

References

External links
 

2020 film awards
2021 film awards
2020 in British cinema
2021 in British cinema
2021 in London
Film074
Events at the Royal Albert Hall
April 2021 events in the United Kingdom
2020 awards in the United Kingdom
2021 awards in the United Kingdom